On Stage is an album by the Gerald Wilson Orchestra recorded in 1965 and released on the Pacific Jazz label.

Reception

AllMusic rated the album with 4 stars; in his review, Scott Yanow said: "Arranger Gerald Wilson led one of the finest big bands of the 1960s. This out of print LP features the L.A. orchestra in top form although, since it is a studio album, its title is inaccurate".

Track listing 
All compositions by Gerald Wilson except as indicated
 "Los Moros de Espana" - 3:05
 "Who Can I Turn To?" (Leslie Bricusse, Anthony Newley) - 2:50
 "Ricardo" - 4:30
 "Musette" - 2:34
 "In the Limelight" - 5:47
 "Lighthouse Blues" - 7:25
 "El Viti" - 3:50
 "Lately" (Lester Robertson) - 3:42
 "Perdido" (Juan Tizol) - 4:26 
Recorded at Capitol Studios on January 13, 1965 (tracks 1, 4, 6 & 9) and Pacific Jazz Studios on March 10, 1965 (tracks 2, 3, 5, 7 & 8) in Hollywood, CA. The album is also known as In The Limelight

Personnel 
Gerald Wilson - arranger, conductor, trumpet
Bobby Bryant (tracks 2, 3, 5, 7 & 8), Jules Chaikin, Freddie Hill, Nat Meeks, Melvin Moore, Al Porcino (tracks 1, 4, 6 & 9) - trumpet
Bob Edmondson, John Ewing, Lester Robertson - trombone
Don Switzer (tracks 1, 4, 6 & 9), Ernie Tack (tracks 2, 3, 5, 7 & 8) - bass trombone
Bud Shank - alto saxophone, flute (tracks 1, 4, 6 & 9) 
Anthony Ortega - alto saxophone
Curtis Amy (tracks 1, 4, 6 & 9), Teddy Edwards, Harold Land - tenor saxophone
Jack Nimitz - baritone saxophone
Roy Ayers - vibraphone
Phil Moore III - piano
Jack Wilson - piano, organ (tracks 2, 3, 5, 7 & 8)
Joe Pass - guitar
Victor Gaskin (tracks 2, 3, 5, 7 & 8), Herbie Lewis (tracks 1, 4, 6 & 9) - bass
Chuck Carter - drums

References 

Gerald Wilson albums
1965 albums
Pacific Jazz Records albums
Albums arranged by Gerald Wilson
Albums conducted by Gerald Wilson